Tribeč is a crystalline mountain range in western Slovakia, in the Inner Western Carpathians located in the Nitra Region. It is surrounded by the Danubian Lowland, Pohronský Inovec, Vtáčnik Mountains and the Upper Nitra Basin. Beech trees are predominate in the area. The area belongs to the Ponitrie Protected Landscape Area.

Landscape 
It is surrounded by Zlaté Moravce, Topoľčany, Partizánske and Nitra, giving it a rectangular shape. Tribeč is also part of a larger belt of core mountains; The Fatra-Tatra Area. In the east, it connects to Pohronský Inovec and Vtáčnik, and descends into the Hornonitrian basin.

Disappearances 
Since the popular Slovak bestseller book Trhlina and its follow-up film adaptation with the same name (The Rift), Tribeč became associated with conspiracies. Some are calling it the Bermuda Triangle of Slovakia.

The history of these strange disappearances dates back to the 18th and 19th century, when the first known legend was written.

References

Mountain ranges of Slovakia
Mountain ranges of the Western Carpathians